Captain William G. Taylor (9 August 1829 – 28 March 1910) was an American sailor who fought in the American Civil War. Taylor received his country's highest award for bravery during combat, the Medal of Honor, for his actions on the  during the First Battle of Fort Fisher.

Taylor was from Philadelphia, Pennsylvania, and buried in Quincy, Illinois.

Medal of Honor citation

See also
List of American Civil War Medal of Honor recipients: T–Z

References

1829 births
1910 deaths
Union Navy officers
United States Navy Medal of Honor recipients
American Civil War recipients of the Medal of Honor
Military personnel from Philadelphia
People of Pennsylvania in the American Civil War